Live VI is the sixth live release by post-metal band Isis, recorded at the Hawthorne Theatre in Portland, Oregon on November 16, 2007. It was released as a digital download on February 14, 2012, and on limited-edition vinyl through the band's online store. It is notable for being the first album announced and released by the band since their 2010 dissolution (Melvins / Isis was announced before their breakup and released afterwards).

The recording boasts the best sound quality among Isis' live releases, having been recorded and mixed by drummer Aaron Harris and mastered by James Plotkin. Live VI is also notable for being the most diverse live recording by Isis, featuring material from six different albums (including early EP's Mosquito Control and The Red Sea).

The band had hinted at a release for months through their Facebook page, with Live VI being the fulfillment of that promise.

Track listing

Personnel
 Aaron Turner – vocals, Guitar
 Jeff Caxide – Bass guitar
 Michael Gallagher – Guitar
 Aaron Harris – Drums
 Bryant Clifford Meyer – Keyboards and guitar
 Maria Christopher – Vocals and guitar on "Weight"
 Ayal Naor – Vocals on "Weight"
Mixed by Aaron Harris at Vista studios, Los Angeles, CA, 2011
Mastering by James Plotkin, 2011

References

External links 
 Live VI at Bandcamp (streamed copy where licensed)

Isis (band) live albums
2006 live albums